The Hallberg-Rassy 40 is a Swedish sailboat, that was designed by Germán Frers and first built in 2002. The yacht is a high quality blue water cruiser capable of extended ocean passages.

The design is built by Hallberg-Rassy in Sweden and the Mark II version ceased production in 2018.

Design
The Hallberg-Rassy 40 is a recreational centre-cockpit keelboat, built predominantly of fiberglass, with wood trim. It has a masthead sloop rig, an internally-mounted spade-type rudder on a partial skeg controlled by a wheel  and a fixed fin keel with lead ballast. It displaces .

Awards
The Hallberg-Rassy 40 has won the following awards:

 Cruising World’s Boat of the Year in the Cruising Category in 2004.
 2004 European Yacht of the Year in the 12-15m category.
 2004 Best Liveaboard Cruising Boat.
 Sailboat of the Show in Stockholm.

See also
List of sailing boat types

https://www.sailingtheweb.com/en/sailboat/hallberg+rassy/hallberg+rassy+40==References==

Keelboats
2000s sailboat type designs
Sailing yachts
Sailboat type designs by Germán Frers
Sailboat types built by Hallberg-Rassy